Liisa-Maria Sneck (born 10 November 1968) is a Finnish retired ice hockey goaltender. She played with the Finnish national ice hockey team during 1988 to 1998 and won three IIHF European Women Championship gold medals, four IIHF Women's World Championship bronze medals, and a bronze medal at the inaugural Olympic women's ice hockey tournament at the 1998 Winter Olympics.

Her club career was played in the Naisten SM-sarja during 1984 to 1998 with HIFK Naiset, the Tampereen Ilves Naiset, and the Keravan Shakers. Following her retirement from elite play, Sneck served as goaltending coach to Itä-Helsingin Kiekko (IHK) Naiset in the Naisten SM-sarja for several years.

References

1968 births
Living people
Ice hockey people from Helsinki
Finnish women's ice hockey goaltenders
Ice hockey players at the 1998 Winter Olympics
Medalists at the 1998 Winter Olympics
Olympic bronze medalists for Finland
Olympic ice hockey players of Finland
Olympic medalists in ice hockey
Ilves Naiset players
HIFK Naiset players
Naisten Liiga (ice hockey) coaches